Basikhola is a village development committee in Bhojpur District in Province No. 1 of eastern Nepal. At the time of the 1991 Nepal census it had a population of 4251 persons living in 805 individual households.

References

External links
UN map of the municipalities of Bhojpur District

Populated places in Bhojpur District, Nepal